The  was an electric multiple unit (EMU) train type operated by Tokyo Metropolitan Bureau of Transportation (Toei) on the Toei Asakusa Line in Tokyo, Japan. A total of 27 eight-car trainsets (216 vehicles) were built between 1990 and 1998 by Kawasaki Heavy Industries, Nippon Sharyo, Kinki Sharyo, and Hitachi.

The train type was introduced into service on 31 March 1991 following the introduction of Hokuso Kodan Line inter-running services, and to replace the 5000 series trainsets that had been used on the Asakusa Line since its inception in 1960. The 5300 series was withdrawn between 2018 and 2023 following the introduction of new 5500 series trainsets.

Formation
, the fleet consisted of 27 eight-car trainsets formed as follows, with four motored ("M") cars and four non-powered trailer ("T") cars, and car 1 at the south end.

 Cars 3 and 6 each had two lozenge-type pantographs.
 Car 3 was designated as a "mildy air-conditioned" car.

Interior
Passenger accommodation consisted of longitudinal bucket seating throughout. LED passenger information displays were provided above each passenger door. The sets were initially built with illuminated route maps above the doors, but these were eventually replaced with conventional route maps.

History
The 5300 series was introduced on 31 March 1991 to fulfill capacity requirements brought on by the commencement of Hokuso Kodan Line (now known as the Hokuso Line) inter-running services, and to replace the ageing Toei 5000 series trains which had been used on the Toei Asakusa Line since its opening in 1960. Sets built from 1994 onwards (5315 onward) feature a lengthened front-end skirt.

After the speed limit of the Keikyu Line was raised to allow for  operation between Shinagawa and Yokohama stations in 1995, a 5300 series set (5327) entered service in 1998 with uprated traction motors (to ) to support such operation. There were plans to modify the rest of the fleet accordingly, but they never came to fruition.

Retirement
Following the introduction of new Toei 5500 series trainsets, withdrawals commenced on 27 July 2018, with set 5301 being the first to be withdrawn; it was scrapped on 1 August of that year. Set 5320, the last trainset in operation, made its final trip in revenue service in February 2023.

Gallery

Notes

References

External links

 Kinki Sharyo information 

Electric multiple units of Japan
5300
Train-related introductions in 1991
Hitachi multiple units
Kawasaki multiple units
Kinki Sharyo multiple units
Nippon Sharyo multiple units
1500 V DC multiple units of Japan